The Dengdeng Waterfall is located in the Tasikmalaya Regency in West Java.

Etymology
The name "Dengdeng" comes from the word Bedengan, which means level in Indonesia. The upstream of this waterfall is located on Mount Raja (King Mountain), while its downstream is at Cimedang river.

Location
Dengdeng waterfall is located at Caringin hamlet, Cikawung Gading village, Cipatujah sub district, Tasikmalaya Regency, West Java Province. The distance is around 90 Kilometer from Tasikmalaya City and takes around 3 hours.

Physical makeup
Dengdeng waterfall has 3 terrains. The first terrain stands about 13 Meter high, while the second and the third terrain stands around 11 and 9 Meter high. Under the last waterfall, there is a big pool with fresh and clear water in which tourists are allowed to bathe.

Nowadays, tourists can drive up to the parking lot near the second waterfall. There, visitors just have to walk down the wooden stairs to reach the second terrain to see the second waterfall.

Notes

Waterfalls of Java
Tasikmalaya Regency